Thomas W. Meaux (born September 15, 1954) is a former member of the Wisconsin State Assembly.

Biography
Meaux was born on September 15, 1954 in Milwaukee, Wisconsin. He graduated from Marquette University High School before attending the University of Wisconsin–Eau Claire, California State University, Fullerton and the University of Wisconsin–Milwaukee.

Career
Meaux was first elected to the Assembly in a special election on January 12, 1982. He is a Democrat.

References

Politicians from Milwaukee
Democratic Party members of the Wisconsin State Assembly
University of Wisconsin–Eau Claire alumni
California State University, Fullerton alumni
University of Wisconsin–Milwaukee alumni
1954 births
Living people
Marquette University High School alumni